Husebye is a surname. Notable people with the surname include:

Birgitte Husebye, Norwegian orienteering competitor
Eystein Husebye (born 1937), Norwegian seismologist
Finn Moestue Husebye (1905–2001), Norwegian priest
Leif Husebye (1926–2009), Norwegian sailor, sports journalist, and newspaper editor
Gregory Husebye, (born 1949) American artist and poet.